The Blind Wound is an EP re-release of Leviathan's contribution to 2006's Leviathan / Sapthuran split album. It was re-pressed on LP by Southern Lord Records and was limited to five hundred copies on black vinyl and five hundred copies on silver vinyl, also pressed on black / green vinyl and green/red vinyl.

Track listing 

Leviathan (musical project) albums
2006 EPs
Southern Lord Records EPs